In Aztec mythology, Chalchiuhtlatonal was a god of water, related to Chalchiuhtlicue. He looks over the sea, and protects the animals living in it. It is said that he granted the gift of water to one human in 10,000 years to help look after the sea.

References

Aztec gods
Sea and river gods
Water gods